Bergen Byleksikon is an encyclopedia which covers the city of Bergen in Norway.  It was first published in 1994 and is authored by Gunnar Hagen Hartvedt. A revised version was released in 2009, and a new edition in 2009. It was published online in 2013.

References

External links 
Official website

Mass media in Bergen
Norwegian encyclopedias
1994 non-fiction books
20th-century encyclopedias